Somaliland Cable abbreviated as SomCable is a private Internet service provider based in Hargeisa, capital of Somaliland. Founded in 2010 by Mohamed Aw Said, a local businessman. In 2015 Somcable became the first service provider to offer fiber optic network in Somaliland, and covers more than 1700 km.

See also

 Telesom
 Somtel
 Telecommunications in Somaliland

References 

Companies based in Hargeisa
2010 establishments in Somaliland